CCMP or ccmp may refer to:

 CCMP (cryptography), an encryption protocol used in Wi-Fi
 CCMP Capital, a private equity investment firm
 cyclic CMP (cCMP), a cyclic nucleotide